Korejovce is a village and municipality in Svidník District in the Prešov Region of north-eastern Slovakia.

History
In historical records the village was first mentioned in 1600.

Geography
The municipality lies at an altitude of 265 metres and covers an area of 4.061 km². It has a population of about 65 people.

Genealogical resources

The records for genealogical research are available at the state archive "Statny Archiv in Presov, Slovakia"

 Greek Catholic church records (births/marriages/deaths): 1787-1950 (parish B)

See also
 List of municipalities and towns in Slovakia

References

External links
 
 
https://web.archive.org/web/20090412234949/http://www.statistics.sk/mosmis/eng/run.html
Surnames of living people in Korejovce

Villages and municipalities in Svidník District
Šariš